Udea capsifera is a moth in the family Crambidae. It was described by Edward Meyrick in 1933. It is found in Argentina.

References

Moths described in 1933
capsifera